Walter Barfuss (4 February 1955 – 24 July 1999) was a West German bobsledder who competed in the late 1970s. He won two bronze medals at the FIBT World Championships (Two-man: 1978, Four-man: 1977). Barfuss also finished seventh in the four-man event at the 1980 Winter Olympics in Lake Placid, New York.

References

External links
Bobsleigh two-man world championship medalists since 1931
Bobsleigh four-man world championship medalists since 1930
Wallechinsky, David (1984). "Bobsled: Four-man". In The Complete Book of the Olympics: 1896 - 1980. New York: Penguin Books. p. 562.

Bobsledders at the 1980 Winter Olympics
German male bobsledders
1955 births
1999 deaths
Olympic bobsledders of West Germany